In logic, the term conditional disjunction can refer to:

conditioned disjunction, a ternary logical connective introduced by Alonzo Church
a rule in classical logic that the material conditional  is equivalent to the disjunction , so that these two formulae are interchangeable - see Negation